Paolo Lorenzi unsuccessfully defended his title, and was eliminated by Antonio Veić in the first round.

Blaž Kavčič won the tournament, defeating Rubén Ramírez Hidalgo 6–4, 3–6, 7–6(5) in the final.

Seeds

Draw

Finals

Top half

Bottom half

References
Main Draw
Qualifying Singles

Rijeka Open - Singles
Rijeka Open